Manikandan (born 1983) is an Indian actor, who has appeared in Tamil language films. He has acted in films including Boys (2003) and Kicha Vayasu 16 (2005).

Career
Manikanda, a visual communications graduate who had featured in Kala’s dance troupe doing stage shows, was selected by Shankar to feature in his coming-of-age film Boys after impressing in auditions. He shot for the film throughout 2002 alongside fellow debutants Siddharth, Genelia D'Souza, Bharath, Nakul and Thaman. The story centred on six youngsters, conveying a message about the importance of a good education and career over other distractions, such as romance and sex, and marked a move away from Shankar's usual brand of vigilante films, gaining much publicity prior to release. The film opened to mixed reviews but became  successful at the box office, with reviewers noting the ensemble cast as "excellent". In the following years, while the other five debut actors have been successful, Manikandan has struggled to receive acclaim and feature in high-profile films.

Notably, director Shankar revealed that Manikandan was edged by Bharath to star in Balaji Sakthivel's Kaadhal (2004), which had won Bharath significant acclaim. Manikandan subsequently received offers to feature as the lead actor in Kadhal FM (2005) and then alongside Simran in Kicha Vayasu 16, but both films had low key releases and fared poorly at the box office. He has since starred in several low-budget films, including Gurusamy and Kaadhal 2014.

Filmography

References

Living people
Male actors in Tamil cinema
21st-century Indian male actors
1980 births